Henry Frederick Lippitt (October 12, 1856December 28, 1933) was a member of the prominent Lippitt family, which made its fortune in the textile business, and served as United States Senator from Rhode Island.

Biography
Born in Providence on October 12, 1856, Lippitt was the son of Henry Lippitt and Mary Ann (Balch) Lippitt.  He attended Mowry & Goff's, a private school in Providence, and received his Bachelor of Arts degree from Brown University in 1878.  He was president of his graduating class and admitted to membership in Phi Beta Kappa.  After graduation, Lippitt and joined his family's cotton textile manufacturing business.

Lippitt was director of the Slater Trust Company of Pawtucket and of several mill insurance companies.  He was also vice president of the People's Savings Bank of Providence and a director of the Mechanics National Bank.

He served on the Governor's staff with the rank of colonel in 1888-1889 and was president of the New England Cotton Manufacturers' Association (now the National Textile Association) in 1889.

Lippitt was elected to the United States Senate as a Republican and served from March 4, 1911 to March 3, 1917.  While in the Senate, he was chairman of the Committee on Expenditures in the Department of Agriculture (Sixty-second Congress).  Lippitt had been elected by the state legislature, and was an unsuccessful candidate for reelection in 1916, following passage of the Seventeenth Amendment, which provided that U.S. Senators be chosen by popular vote.

After leaving the Senate, he again became actively engaged in the textile industry.  He served as Chairman of the Board of the Manville-Jenckes tire fabric company of Pawtucket.

He was a member of the Squantum Association, Hope Club, Agawam Hunt Club, Rhode Island Yacht Club, New York Yacht Club, Larchmont Yacht Club, and University Club of New York.  He was also a member of New England Cotton Manufacturers' Association, and in 1892 he joined the Rhode Island Society of the Sons of the American Revolution.

Senator Lippitt died in Providence December 28, 1933.  He was interred in the Lippitt family plot at Swan Point Cemetery.

Family
In 1881 Lippitt married Mary Louise Bowen, a member of another family prominent in the Rhode Island textile manufacturing business.  Their children included Louise, Henry, Frances, and John Bowen Lippitt.

Following the death of his first wife, Lippitt married Lucy Herron Laughlin in 1915, a sister of former First Lady Helen Herron Taft and widow of Thomas K. Laughlin of Pittsburgh.  They had two children: Rhode Island politician and philanthropist Frederick Lippitt and aviator Mary Ann Lippitt.

Henry F. Lippitt was the son of Rhode Island Governor Henry Lippitt and the brother of Rhode Island Governor Charles W. Lippitt.  He was also a great-uncle of John H. Chafee and a great-great-uncle of Lincoln D. Chafee, both U.S. Senators as well as governors of Rhode Island.

See also 
 Frederick Lippitt (son)
Mary Ann Lippitt (daughter)
Lucy Hayes Herron (second wife)

References

Sources

Magazines

Books

Newspapers

External links
 

1856 births
1933 deaths
Brown University alumni
Rhode Island Republicans
Republican Party United States senators from Rhode Island
Burials at Swan Point Cemetery
Politicians from Providence, Rhode Island
Psi Upsilon